Haberlandia isakaensis is a moth in the family Cossidae. It is found in the Democratic Republic of Congo. The habitat consists of lowland rainforests.

The wingspan is about 21 mm. The forewings are ecru-olive with buffy olive lines from the costal margin to the dorsum. The hindwings are ecru-olive with fine striae.

Etymology
The species is named for Isaka, the type locality.

References

Natural History Museum Lepidoptera generic names catalog

Moths described in 2011
Metarbelinae
Taxa named by Ingo Lehmann
Endemic fauna of the Democratic Republic of the Congo